Ukrainian collaboration with Nazi Germany took place during the occupation of Poland and the Ukrainian SSR by Nazi Germany in World War II. 

By September 1941 the German-occupied  territory of Soviet Ukraine was divided between two new German administrative units, the District of Galicia of the Nazi General Government and the Reichskommissariat Ukraine. During the war, some Ukrainians chose to resist and fight the German occupation forces and either joined the Red Army or the irregular partisan units, conducting guerrilla warfare against the Germans. However, other Ukrainian people, specifically in western Ukraine, had "little to no loyalty towards the Soviet Union", and worked alongside the Nazis against Allied forces. Ukrainian nationalists hoped that enthusiastic collaboration would enable them to re-establish an independent state. They were involved in a series of war crimes and crimes against humanity, including the Holocaust in Ukraine and the massacres of Poles in Volhynia and Eastern Galicia.

Ukrainians who collaborated with the Nazi Germany did so in various ways including participating in the local administration, in German-supervised auxiliary police, Schutzmannschaft, in the German military, and serving as concentration camp guards.

Background
Stalin and Hitler pursued the policy of territorial demands on their immediate neighbour, Poland. The Soviet invasion of Poland brought together Ukrainians of Soviet Ukraine and the Ukrainians of what was then Eastern Poland (Kresy), under the single Soviet banner. In the territories of Poland invaded by Nazi Germany, the size of Ukrainian minority became negligible and was gathered mostly around UCC (УЦК), formed in Kraków.

Fewer than two years later, Nazi Germany attacked the Soviet Union. The German Operation Barbarossa began on June 22, 1941. Operation Barbarossa brought together native Ukrainians of Soviet Ukraine and the prewar territories of Poland annexed by the Soviet Union as well. By September the occupied territory was divided between two brand new German administrative units: to the southwest, the District of Galicia of the Nazi General Government, and the northeast, Reichskommissariat Ukraine stretching all the way to Donbas by 1943.

Reinhard Heydrich noted in a report dated July 9, 1941 that "a fundamental difference between the former Polish and Russian [Soviet] territories. In the former Polish region, the soviet regime was seen as enemy rule... Hence the German troops were greeted by Polish as well as the White Ruthenian population [meaning Ukrainian and Belarusian] for the most part at least as liberators or with friendly neutrality... The situation in the current occupied White Ruthenian areas of the [pre-1939] USSR has a completely different basis." Actions of German field commanders also indicate a general hostility towards the German in the opening stages of the war, and an order dated August 8, 1941 saw all men between the ages of 18 and 45 rounded up to prevent sabotage.

Ukrainian nationalist partisan leader Taras Bulba-Borovets gathered a force of 3,000 in summer 1941 to assist the Wehrmacht in fighting the Red Army, before the Germans attempted to disarm them a few months later, forcing them to fight both Germany and the Soviet Union before reaching a truce with the latter in 1942. Because of the fluid nature of these allegiances, historian Alfred Rieber emphasized that labels such as "collaborators" and "resistance" were rendered useless in describing the actual loyalty of these groups. However, in the newly annexed portions of western Ukraine, there was little to no loyalty towards the Soviet Union, whose Red Army had seized Ukraine during the Soviet invasion of Poland in September 1939.

Occupation

Those Ukrainians who did collaborate with the German occupiers did so in various ways including participating in the local administration, in German-supervised auxiliary police, Schutzmannschaft, in the German military, and serving as concentration camp guards. Nationalists in western Ukraine were among the most enthusiastic and hoped that their efforts would enable them to re-establish an independent state later on. For example, on the eve of Operation' Barbarossa, as many as 4000 Ukrainians, operating under Wehrmacht orders, sought to cause disruption behind Soviet lines. After the capture of Lviv, a highly-contentious and strategically important city with a significant Ukrainian minority, OUN leaders proclaimed a new Ukrainian State on June 30, 1941, and simultaneously encouraged loyalty to the new regime in the hope that they would be supported by the Germans. Already in 1939, during the German-Polish War, the OUN had been "a faithful German auxiliary".

Despite initially acting warmly to the idea of an independent Ukraine, the Nazi administration had other ideas, particularly the Lebensraum programme and the total 'Aryanisation' of the population. It preferred to play the Slavic nations against one another. OUN  initially carried out attacks on Polish villages to try to exterminate Polish populations or expel Polish enclaves from what the OUN fighters perceived as Ukrainian territory. This culminated in the mass killings of Polish families in Volhynia and Eastern Galicia.

According to Timothy Snyder, "something that is never said, because it's inconvenient for precisely everyone, is that more Ukrainian Communists collaborated with the Germans, than did Ukrainian nationalists." Snyder also points out that very many of those who collaborated with the German occupation also collaborated with the Soviet policies in the 1930s.

The Holocaust

The atrocities against Jews during the Holocaust in Ukraine started within a few days of the beginning of the Nazi occupation. There are indications that the Ukrainian Auxiliary Police, formed on 20 August 1941, was used in the roundup of Jews for the Babi Yar massacre, and in other massacres in cities and towns of modern-day Ukraine, such as Stepan, Lviv, Lutsk, and Zhytomyr. On 1 September 1941, Nazi-sponsored Ukrainian newspaper Volhyn wrote: "The element that settled our cities (Jews)... must disappear completely from our cities. The Jewish problem is already in the process of being solved."

Reinforced by religious prejudice, antisemitism had turned violent in the first days of the German attack on the Soviet Union. Some Ukrainians derived nationalist resentment from the belief that the Jews had worked for Polish landlords. The NKVD prisoner massacres by the Soviet secret police while they retreated eastward were blamed on Jews. The antisemitic canard of Jewish Bolshevism provided justification for the revenge killings by the ultranationalist Ukrainian People's Militia, which accompanied German Einsatzgruppen moving east. In Boryslav (prewar Borysław, Poland, population 41,500), the SS commander gave an enraged crowd, which had seen bodies of men murdered by NKVD and laid out in the town square, 24 hours to act as they wished against Polish Jews, who were forced to clean the dead bodies and to dance and then were killed by beating with axes, pipes etc. The same type of mass murders took place in Brzezany. During Lviv pogroms, 7,000 Jews were murdered by Ukrainian nationalists, led by the Ukrainian People's Militia. As late as 1945, Ukrainian militants were still rounding up and murdering Jews.

While some of the collaborators were civilians, others were given a choice to enlist for paramilitary service beginning in September 1941 from the Soviet prisoner-of-war camps because of ongoing close relations with the Ukrainian Hilfsverwaltung. In total, over 5,000 native Ukrainian soldiers of the Red Army signed up for training with the SS at a special Trawniki training camp to assist with the Final Solution. Another 1,000 of them defected during field operations. Trawniki men took major part in the Nazi plan to exterminate European Jews during Operation Reinhard. They served at all extermination camps and played an important role in the annihilation of the Warsaw Ghetto Uprising (see the Stroop Report) and the Białystok Ghetto Uprising among other ghetto insurgencies. The men who were dispatched to death camps and Jewish ghettos as guards were never fully trusted and so were always overseen by Volksdeutsche. Occasionally, along with the prisoners they were guarding, they would kill their commanders in the process of attempting to defect.

In May 2006, the Ukrainian newspaper Ukraine Christian News commented, "Carrying out the massacre was the Einsatzgruppe C, supported by members of a Waffen-SS battalion and units of the Ukrainian auxiliary police, under the general command of Friedrich Jeckeln. The participation of Ukrainian collaborators in these events, now documented and proven, is a matter of painful public debate in Ukraine".

Collaborationist organizations, political movements, individuals and military volunteers

In total, the Germans enlisted 250,000 native Ukrainians for duty in five separate formations including the Nationalist Military Detachments (VVN), the Brotherhoods of Ukrainian Nationalists (DUN), the SS Division Galicia, the Ukrainian Liberation Army (UVV) and the Ukrainian National Army (Ukrainische Nationalarmee, UNA). By the end of 1942, in Reichskommissariat Ukraine alone, the SS employed 238,000 Ukrainians and only 15,000 Germans, a ratio of 1 to 16.

Auxiliary police

The 109th, 114th, 115th, 116th, 117th, 118th, 201st Ukrainian Schutzmannschaft-battalions participated in anti-partisan operations in Ukraine and Belarus. In February and March 1943, the 50th Ukrainian Schutzmannschaft Battalion participated in the large anti-guerrilla action «Operation Winterzauber» (Winter magic) in Belarus, cooperating with several Latvian and the 2nd Lithuanian battalion. Schuma-battalions burned down villages suspected of supporting Soviet partisans. On March 22, 1943, all inhabitants of the village of Khatyn in Belarus were burnt alive by the Nazis in what became known as the Khatyn massacre, with participation of the 118th Schutzmannschaft battalion.

According to Paul R. Magocsi, "Ukrainian auxiliary police and militia, or simply "Ukrainians" (a generic term that in fact included persons of non-Ukrainian as well as Ukrainian national background) partecipated in the overall process as policemen and camp guards".

Ukrainian volunteers in the German armed forces
 Nachtigall Battalion
 Roland Battalion
 Freiwilligen-Stamm-Regiment 3 & 4 (Russians & Ukrainians)

SS Division Galicia

On 28 April 1943 the German Governor of the District of Galicia, Otto Wächter, and the local Ukrainian administration officially declared the creation of the SS Division Galicia. Volunteers signed for service as of 3 June 1943 and numbered 80,000. On 27 July 1944, the division was formed into the Waffen-SS as 14th Waffen Grenadier Division of the SS (1st Ukrainian).

The prevailing belief is that these men eagerly volunteered to take part in a patriotic war against the Soviets, not because of any support for Nazi Germany. Also, at least some of them were victims of compulsory conscription, since Germany had now suffered defeats and lost manpower on the eastern front. Sol Litman of the Simon Wiesenthal Center state that there are many proven and documented incidents of atrocities and massacres committed by the unit against minorities, particularly Jews during World War II. However other authors, including Michael Melnyk, maintain that members of the division served almost entirely on the front lines against the Red Army and defend the unit against the accusations made by Litman and others. Official SS records show that the 4, 5, 6 and 7 SS-Freiwilligen regiments were under Ordnungspolizei command during the accusations. (See 14th Waffen Grenadier Division of the SS (1st Galician)#Atrocities).

Ukrainian units in the German work organization
 Organization Todt OT-Einsatzgruppe Ost (Kiev)

Ukrainian National Committee

In March 1945, the Ukrainian National Committee was set up after a series of negotiations with the Germans. The Committee represented and had command over all Ukrainian units fighting for the Third Reich, such as the Ukrainian National Army. However, it was too late, and the committee and the army were disbanded at the end of the war.

Ukrainian Central Committee 
The Central Committee was the officially recognized Ukrainian community and quasi-political organization under the Nazi occupation of Poland.

Organization of Ukrainian Nationalists
 Ukrainian National Government of the Ukrainian State, led by OUN-B. Suppressed by the Nazis shortly after its establishment.
 , a Ukrainian governmental body, led by OUN-M, modeled after the Ukrainian National Council of the West Ukrainian People's Republic. Proclaimed in 1941 in KIev with Mykola Velychkivsky as its head, it was suppressed by the authorities of Reichskommissariat Ukraine at the end of the year and reorganised in 1944.

Heads of local Ukrainian administration and public figures under the German occupation
 Oleksander Ohloblyn (1899-1992) in the fall of 1941, Ohloblyn was appointed the Mayor of Kiev at the behest of the Organization of Ukrainian Nationalists. He held the post from September 21 to October 25.
 Volodymyr Bahaziy (Kiev mayor, 1941–1942, executed by Germans in 1942)
 Leontii Forostivsky (Kiev mayor, 1942–1943)
 Fedir Bohatyrchuk (head of the Ukrainian Red Cross, 1941–1942)
 Oleksii Kramarenko (Kharkov mayor, 1941–1942, executed by Germans in 1943)
 Oleksander Semenenko (Kharkov mayor, 1942–1943)
 Paul Kozakevich (Kharkov mayor, 1943)
 Aleksandr Sevastianov (Vinnytsia mayor, 1941 – ?)

See also
 Collaboration with the Axis Powers during World War II
 History of the Jews in Ukraine
 List of Ukrainian Righteous Among the Nations

References

Further reading

 Armstrong, J. A. (1968). Collaborationism in World War II: The Integral Nationalist Variant in Eastern Europe. The Journal of Modern History, 40(3), pp. 396–410.

 
 
 
 

Modern history of Ukraine
Military history of Germany during World War II
The Holocaust in Ukraine
The Holocaust in Poland
Collaboration with Nazi Germany
Nazi war crimes in the Soviet Union